Jean Daniel Cadinot (10 February 1944 – 23 April 2008) was a French photographer, and director/producer of gay pornographic films. His photography focused on homoerotic imagery, and his films are noted for their  emphasis on plot and realism.

Biography
Cadinot was born during World War II, in German-occupied Paris, in the Montmartre hill area of the Batignolles Quarter. His parents were tailors who custom fit clothes. Cadinot later remarked that while his parents had clothed men, he earned his reputation for undressing them.

As a teenager, Cadinot hoped to become a painter and, due to parental opposition, ran away from home at the age of 17. In the early 1960s, he studied at École des Arts et Métiers and at the National School of Photography. He then began his professional career at Valois Studios, where he directed mainstream films for French-speaking audiences.

He first pursued a career in photography, which took on a homosexual angle with his nude portrait of writer Yves Navarre and singer Patrick Juvet. His erotic photographs appeared in the first edition of Gai Pied. He began to sell nude photographs and finally moved to directing movies in 1978. By then, he had published 17 photo albums, with total sales of over 170,000 copies.

Setting up his own production company, French Art, Cadinot made dozens of 16 mm films.

Characteristic of Cadinot's films was an emphasis on plot, much more so than in typical porn films. His plots were often based originally on incidents from his own life, but he was known for adjusting the plot during filming to incorporate experiences of his actors. He insisted on realism in his films, especially in sex scenes, saying that the actors "do not portray things that are imposed on them by me, but things they like to do themselves".

By 1998, he had directed fifty-four films, some under the pseudonym Tony Dark.

In 2004, he won a FICEB HeatGay Award for Best Director (Les secrets de famille - French Art).

On 23 April 2008, Cadinot died of a heart attack. After his death, the company French Art was headed by François Orenn, a classically trained pianist who started working for Cadinot as a score composer and who managed the company from 2002. Two unfinished films by Cadinot, Subversion and Le Culte d'Eros, have since been released. Orenn also began directing films of his own in Cadinot's style (Anges et Démons and L'Avarice) and with Cadinot's technical crew.

In 2013, StudioPresse and PinkTv jointly acquired the Cadinot trademark and exclusive distribution rights on all Cadinot movies, including previously unreleased material. The website "Cadinot.fr" is owned by StudioPresse, which is known to own other gay labels such Jnrc, Citebeur, GayArabClub etc.

Partial filmography

See also

 List of male performers in gay porn films
 List of pornographic movie studios

References

External links
 
 
 

 

1944 births
2008 deaths
French photographers
LGBT film directors
French LGBT photographers
French gay artists
Gay photographers
Directors of gay pornographic films
French pornographic film directors
French pornographic film producers
Producers of gay pornographic films
20th-century LGBT people